Ernest Yust (1927-1992) was a Soviet and Hungarian football player and later Soviet coach.

Overview
From 1940 to 1946 played for Ungvari AC (УАК) (Uzhgorod), 1947/1948 and 1959/1960 for Spartak Uzhgorod, from 1949 to 1958 — for Dynamo Kyiv. With Dynamo Kyiv he won USSR Cup in 1954 and silver medal in USSR Championship in 1952. In Soviet Premier League played 123 matches, scored 1 goal.

In 1956 Yust played couple of games for Ukraine at the Spartakiad of the Peoples of the USSR.

He was of the most prominent coaches in Karpaty Lviv's history — he won USSR Cup in 1969, played in UEFA Cup Winners' Cup, and brought Karpaty to Soviet Top League, where it finished 4th two times - 1976 (spring) and 1976 (autumn) - that has been the biggest achievement in Karpaty' history.

Titles

As player 
 USSR Cup: 1954 (Dinamo Kiev)

As head coach (manager) 
 USSR Cup: 1969 (Karpaty Lviv)

References

External links
 Profile at the Kopanyi-Myach

1927 births
1992 deaths
Sportspeople from Uzhhorod
People from Carpathian Ruthenia
Ukrainian footballers
Soviet footballers
Soviet ice hockey players
Hungarian footballers
FC Hoverla Uzhhorod players
FC Dynamo Kyiv players
Soviet football managers
Ukrainian football managers
FC Karpaty Lviv managers
Association football midfielders
Soviet Top League players
Piddubny Olympic College alumni
National University of Ukraine on Physical Education and Sport alumni